The Eurovision Song Contest 1988 was the 33rd edition of the annual Eurovision Song Contest. Organised by the European Broadcasting Union (EBU) and host broadcaster  (RTÉ), the contest was held at the RDS Simmonscourt on 30 April 1988 and was hosted by Irish broadcaster Pat Kenny and the Miss Ireland 1980 Michelle Rocca, marking the first time since the  contest that two presenters had hosted the contest.

Twenty-one countries took part, after an initial plan of twenty-two, as ' song was disqualified for breaching the contest's rules by being published a few years earlier, in an attempt to represent the country at a prior edition of the contest. The Cypriot song had been drawn to be performed 2nd in the running order.

The victory helped launch Dion's international career, subsequently leading her to become one of the best-selling artists of all time.

Location

Dublin is the capital and largest city of Ireland. The contest took place at the Simmonscourt Pavilion of the Royal Dublin Society, which was normally used for agricultural and horse shows. The same venue had hosted the 1981 contest. The staging of the contest in Dublin in 1988 formed part of Dublin's year long celebration of 1000 years since it was established by Scandinavian settlers in 988.

Format

Graphic design
Host broadcaster RTÉ employed Declan Lowney, who was notable for being a director of music videos and youth programming, as director for this edition, in order to revamp the contest to attract and sustain a younger audience. The traditional scoreboard was replaced with two giant Vidiwalls located on either side of the stage, which also projected live images of the performers from the green room where the competitors set during the votes announcements, and a new computer-generated scoreboard was used.

The stage itself, conceived by Paula Farrell under chief production designer Michael Grogan, was also the largest and most elaborate ever constructed for the Eurovision Song Contest. To compensate for the fact that the vast stage took up most of the room in what is really an average size exhibition hall, the director deliberately darkened the hall where the audience was located and refused to use wide angled shots of the audience, in order to create the illusion of the venue being bigger than it actually was.

The Postcards featured the participants doing things in Ireland from culture, to tradition, to sports or sightseeing.

Lowney was also the director of the show's interval act, introduced after the competing songs and before the votes announcement. The interval act was a video of the popular Irish rock group Hothouse Flowers, which was filmed in eleven countries around Europe and was the most expensive music video ever produced in Ireland at the time.

Voting segment
Each country had a jury who awarded 12, 10, 8, 7, 6, 5, 4, 3, 2 and 1 point(s) for its top ten songs. The number of jury members changed this year from 11 which had been the limit since  to 16 which would be used until  when some countries abolished it after the contest in favour of televoting and fully after .

This edition features one of the closest and most fickle-ending votes in the history of the contest. With three countries left to vote, the UK was well in the lead with 133 points against Switzerland's 118. With the third last country, France, only awarding Switzerland one point, the UK looked certain of victory, as even if Switzerland scooped the two final 12s, the UK would only need to gather eleven points from three juries combined to be unbeatable. However, France didn't award the UK any points, and the following country, Portugal, gave the UK a meagre three points while giving the maximum 12 to Switzerland, making the contest blown open between the two countries until the end of the voting.

With the conclusion of voting from the penultimate jury, the UK was holding a five-point lead over Switzerland. As the final jury, that of Yugoslavia, began to award its points in the customary ascending order, a lot of excitement-sighs were heard from the audience to see how the two rivals for victory would fare. Switzerland was the first to be named with six points, edging it into a one-point lead over the UK. After earlier strong votes from most countries to the UK, it seemed highly likely that the UK would be given one of the higher remaining set of points. However, as Yugoslavia announced its seven, eight, ten and twelve points, it transpired that it had awarded the UK no points at all (12 points from Yugoslavia went to France),  and Switzerland was left with its one-point lead to savour a dramatic triumph.

Participating countries
Twenty-one countries took part, after an initial plan of twenty-two, as Cyprus was disqualified after it had already submitted an entry. Cypriot broadcaster CyBC had selected the song 'Thimamai' sung by Yiannis Dimitrou, and at a late stage saw that the song was ineligible to represent them as it had been presented to jurors in the Cypriot internal selection for the  contest, where it had finished in 3rd place. This was classed as a breach of the Cypriot rules of selecting their entry at this time as well as an infringement of the Eurovision Song Contest rules. It was a very late decision as the song was already drawn to perform second in the contest, advertised in the Radio Times information about the preview programme of the contest, and appears as song number two in accordance to its initial performance draw, on the record release "Melodi Grand Prix 1988" – the compilation disc of the contest's entries.

This was the second victory for Switzerland at the Eurovision Song Contest after winning the first edition in 1956. It also remains the last time a song in French has won the contest, the language having dominated the event in earlier years.

The contest helped launch an international career for two artists, the winner for Switzerland Céline Dion and Luxembourg's representative Lara Fabian. French-Canadian Céline Dion was only famous in the French-speaking world at the time of the contest. Shortly afterwards she started recording songs in English to great worldwide success. Belgian-Canadian Lara Fabian started a successful career after the contest with becoming established in various countries worldwide, with a mainly French-sung repertoire. The UK entry was written and composed by Julie Forsyth, the daughter of the entertainer Bruce Forsyth who was present. When interviewed afterwards he was particularly annoyed at the Dutch jury not having given a vote to the UK, as they had done some work there.

Conductors
Each performance had a conductor who was maestro to the orchestra, except for Iceland and Italy. Unlike in most years, the conductors took their bows after each song, not before.

 No conductor
 Anders Berglund
 Ossi Runne
 Ronnie Hazlehurst
 Turhan Yükseler
 Javier de Juan
 Harry van Hoof
 
 Atilla Şereftuğ
 Noel Kelehan
 Michael Thatcher
 Harald Neuwirth
 
 Haris Andreadis
 
 Daniel Willem
 Régis Dupré
 No conductor
 Guy Mattéoni
 José Calvário
 

Prior to Cyprus' disqualification, John Themis was set to conduct and additionally play the guitar solo.

Returning artists
Bold indicates a previous winner.

Participants and results

Detailed voting results

12 points
Below is a summary of all 12 points in the final:

Spokespersons 

Each country announced their votes in the order of performance. The following is a list of spokespersons who announced the votes for their respective country.

 Guðrún Skúladóttir
 Maud Uppling
 Solveig Herlin
 Colin Berry
 Canan Kumbasar
 Matilde Jarrín
 Joop van Os
 Yitzhak Shim'oni
 Michel Stocker
 John Skehan
 Corry von Kiel
 
 
 Fotini Giannoulatou
 Andreas Diesen
 Jacques Olivier
 
 
 
 Maria Margarida Gaspar
 Miša Molk

Broadcasts 

Each participating broadcaster was required to relay the contest via its networks. Non-participating EBU member broadcasters were also able to relay the contest as "passive participants". Broadcasters were able to send commentators to provide coverage of the contest in their own native language and to relay information about the artists and songs to their television viewers.

Known details on the broadcasts in each country, including the specific broadcasting stations and commentators are shown in the tables below. According to the host Pat Kenny, the contest was also broadcast in Soviet Union and Middle East.

Notes

References

External links

 

 
1988
Music festivals in Ireland
1988 in the Republic of Ireland
1988 in music
1980s in Irish television
1980s in Dublin (city)
April 1988 events in Europe
Events in Dublin (city)